ENPA may refer to:
 Enrolled Nurse Professional Association, an Australian nurse association
 European Newspaper Publishers' Association, a newspaper publishing advocacy association